Tsvi Piran  (born May 6, 1949) is an Israeli theoretical physicist and astrophysicist, best known for his work on Gamma-ray Bursts (GRBs) and on numerical relativity. The recipient of the 2019 EMET prize award in Physics and Space Research.   

At a time when most astronomers believed that GRBs were galactic  (see however an earlier suggestion by Bohdan Paczynski )
with Eichler, Livio and Schramm, Piran proposed that GRBs originate from cosmological neutron star binary mergers,  a model that is generally accepted today. During the early nineties when the cosmological vs. galactic debate took place, Piran was one of the strongest and most vocal proponents of cosmological origin,  which was confirmed in 1997 with the discovery of cosmological redshifts from GRB's afterglow.
Even before the cosmological origin of GRBs was discovered Piran laid the foundation to the generally accepted cosmic fireball model. He suggested that GRBs herald the formation of a newborn black hole.
Later on, together with Re'em Sari and other collaborators, Piran further developed the theory of GRB afterglows, in a paper which has by now more than 1000 citations, and of GRB jets. His review papers
are the standard literature on this subject. 
	
Before working on GRBs, Piran made important contributions to numerical relativity, the numerical solution of Einstein's equations. In 1985 he wrote the first numerical code calculating the collapse and formation of a rotating black hole and the resulting gravitational radiation waveform.  This waveform shows relaxation towards the quasinormal modes of the black hole that forms. Detection of this waveform in the future by advanced gravitational radiation detectors might provide the ultimate proof of the existence of a black hole.

In addition to these works, Piran's contributions range over a selection of problems in Relativistic Astrophysics. He demonstrated the critical dependence of the stability of accretion disks on the cooling and heating mechanisms. Piran was the first to point out that inflation is a generic phenomenon involving any scalar field (without requiring a specific potential) and, in particular, that this is so for a free massive scalar field. He went on later to show that, in fact, the onset of inflation is not fully generic and it requires specific initial conditions, 
a concept whose full implications have not been addressed up to now. He was the first to suggest and show that cosmic biasing depends on galaxy types and that different galaxies are distributed differently in the Universe. 
This is a concept that seems obvious today but was controversial when proposed in the late eighties. 
Piran's work includes also contributions to the general theory of relativity such as one of the strongest counter examples to the cosmic censorship hypothesis and the demonstration of the instability of the inner structure of a black hole.

In addition to Piran's work as an astrophysicist, he has served from 2005 until 2009 as the dean of the Hebrew University School of Business Administration. During this term he has made revisions in the school.

Chronology
1967-1970: (undergraduate student) Mathematics and Physics, Tel Aviv University
1970-1972: Military Service and MSc studies Space Sciences, Tel Aviv University under the guidance of A. Eviatar.
1970-1976: Military Service and PhD thesis under the supervision of J. Shaham and J. Katz at the Hebrew University of Jerusalem: Penrose process and on modeling of GRBs from instabilities around black holes.
1976-1977: Research Associate at Oxford with Dennis Sciama's group: accretion disks instabilities and winds
1977-1979: Research associate and later Assistant Prof. at the University of Texas at Austin with Bryce DeWitt's group: foundation of Numerical Relativity, jets in AGNs.
1980-1987: Long term member at the Institute for Advanced Study in Princeton, NJ and a faculty at the Hebrew University of Jerusalem: Numerical Relativity, Rotating gravitational collapse, Inflation, Galaxy biasing, neutrinos from SN 1987A
1988-1990: The Hebrew University: Gamma-ray Bursts
1990-1993: CFA Harvard: Gamma-Ray Bursts
1998-1999: Visiting Prof. Columbia University and NYU
2000-    :Astronomical limits on Lorentz invariance violation
2004-2005: Moore Scholar Caltech
2005-2009: Dean Hebrew University School of Business Administration
2009-    :ERC Advanced Research Grant

Honors
Landau Prize for a distinguished PhD thesis - 1976
Distinguished Moore Fellowship Caltech - 2005
ERC Advanced Research Grant - 2009
ERC Advanced Research Grant - 2016
EMET Prize, Israel, 2019

References

https://scholars.huji.ac.il/tsvipiran

1949 births
Living people
Israeli astrophysicists
Tel Aviv University alumni
Hebrew University of Jerusalem alumni
People from Tel Aviv
Jewish physicists